Roger Pigaut (birth name Roger Paul Louis Pigot) (8 April 1919 – 24 December 1989) was a French actor and film director. He appeared in 40 films between 1943 and 1980.

Partial filmography 

 Retour de flamme (1943) - Maurice
 Love Story (1943) - Fabien Marani
 Twilight (1944) - Petit rôle (uncredited)
 The Eleventh Hour Guest (1945) - Le docteur Rémi Lambert
 The Bellman (1945) - Pierre
 The Murderer is Not Guilty (1946) - Roger Pigaut (uncredited)
 The Sea Rose (1946) - Jérôme
 Night Warning (1946) - Pierre
 The Bouquinquant Brothers (1947) - Pierre Bouquinquant
 Antoine and Antoinette (1947) - Antoine Moulin
 Les condamnés (1948) - Le docteur Auburtin
 Night Express (1948) - Robert
 Bagarres (1948) - Antoine
 Vire-vent (1949) - Paul Chapus
 Cartouche, King of Paris (1950) - Louis Dominique Bourguignon dit Cartouche
 Un sourire dans la tempête (1950) - Francois Mercier
 La peau d'un homme (1951) - Bernard Landry
 The House on the Dune (1952) - Sylvain
 The Agony of the Eagles (1952) - Col. de Montander
 The Blonde Gypsy (1953) - Antoine
 The Count of Monte Cristo (1954) - Fernand de Morcerf
 Theodora, Slave Empress (1954) - Andres
 The Lovers of Manon Lescaut (1954) - Lescaut
 Napoléon (1955) - Le marquis de Caulaincourt
 The Light Across the Street (1955) - Pietri
 La plus belle des vies (1956) - Yves Carlier
 Konga Yo (1962) - Georges
 I Killed Rasputin (1967) - Pourichkevich
 Untamable Angelique (1967) - Le Marquis d'Escrainville
 Angelique and the Sultan (1968) - Le Marquis d'Escrainville
 Mayerling (1968) - Count Karolyi
 Catherine (1969) - Le Grand Connétable Garin
 Trois milliards sans ascenseur (1972, director)
 A Simple Story (1978) - Jérôme

External links

1919 births
1989 deaths
French male film actors
French film directors
People from Vincennes
20th-century French male actors